K. E. Gnanavel Raja is an Indian film producer and entrepreneur from Tamil Nadu, India. He initially began his career by producing and distributing films starring Suriya and Karthi, before branching out to own two studios — Studio Green and Aadnah Arts

Personal life 
Gnanavel Raja is married to Neha Gnanavel.

Career
Gnanavel Raja nurtured an interest in becoming a film producer since his childhood, and revealed that he would regularly skip classes from his school days at St. Bede's Anglo Indian Higher Secondary School, Chennai to watch film screenings at the nearby Devi or Sathyam cinema halls. Gnanavel Raja is also distantly related to actor Sivakumar's family, though has often been labelled by the media as the cousin of Sivakumar's sons Suriya and Karthi.

After founding Studio Green, he entered the production business by producing Sillunu Oru Kaadhal (2006) starring Suriya in the lead role, and then solely collaborated with the actor and his brother Karthi as a producer or distributor for several of their films until 2012. Several of the studio's films including Paruthiveeran (2007), Singam (2010) and Naan Mahaan Alla (2010) were profitable, while dubbed releases of the films in Andhra Pradesh also helped the market of the two actors amongst Telugu-speaking audiences. His first success as a distributor for another actor's films was through Attakathi (2012), and he subsequently enjoyed further success from the distribution of Kumki (2012) and Soodhu Kavvum (2013).

Despite minor setbacks through the commercial failures of Alex Pandian (2013) and All in All Azhagu Raja (2013), Gnanavel Raja experienced success with small-budget productions such as Pa. Ranjith's Madras (2014), Indru Netru Naalai (2015) and Kadhalum Kadandhu Pogum (2016). Likewise distribution deals secured for O Kadhal Kanmani (2015), 36 Vayathinile (2015) and Trisha Illana Nayanthara (2015) also proved to be profitable. Other setbacks came in the form of the release deal for Uttama Villain (2015) and during the release of Komban (2015), where protesters claimed that the story revolved around animosity between different caste groups and that it therefore had the potential to incite violence in southern districts of Tamil Nadu.

During 2016, Gnanavel Raja became involved in a series of clashes with other filmmakers, effectively raising his profile as an individual in the film industry. In May 2016, he was briefly on a hunger strike protesting against the effects of piracy on his latest release, 24 (2016). The following month he called for a ban on future films by Karthik Subbaraj citing that the director had overshot the budget for Iraivi (2016) and that the film had showed producers in negative light. He later called out actor Sivakarthikeyan for failing to honour an acting commitment he had to Studio Green.

In early 2017, Gnanavel Raja criticised the existing Tamil Film Producers Council for failing to adequately tackle piracy, before successfully getting himself elected to the board as the Secretary. He later resigned seven months later, hoping to become the President of Chennai Kanchipuram Thiruvallur District Film Distributors Association, but was eventually unsuccessful. In a press conference in late 2017, he indirectly criticised actors Silambarasan, Trisha and Vadivelu for giving film producers a difficult time.

Alongside Studio Green, he later set up Aadnah Arts and Blue Ghost Pictures, which has two horror films set for release in 2018.

Companies
Studio Green (2006—present)
Aadnah Arts (2015—present)
Blue Ghost Pictures(2017–present)

Filmography

Production

Distribution

References

External links

Living people
Indian Tamil people
Tamil film producers
Telugu film producers
Film producers from Chennai
Year of birth missing (living people)